John Montgomery Smith (February 26, 1834May 14, 1903) was an American lawyer, Democratic politician, and Wisconsin pioneer.  He was a member of the Wisconsin State Assembly, representing Iowa County in the 1893 session, and served four terms as mayor of Mineral Point, Wisconsin.  His father, William Rudolph Smith, was the 5th Attorney General of Wisconsin.  In contemporaneous documents, his name was usually abbreviated as

Early life

John Montgomery Smith was born in 1834, in Bedford Springs, Pennsylvania, and moved to the Wisconsin Territory with his parents at age 4.  They settled in what would become Mineral Point, Wisconsin, where he was raised and educated.  In 1852, he went to California but returned in 1855 and studied law. He was admitted to the Wisconsin bar in 1862.

Political career

He became involved with the Democratic Party of Wisconsin and was elected to two terms as district attorney of Iowa County, Wisconsin, in 1868 and 1870.  He was the Democratic nominee for Attorney General of Wisconsin in 1879, but fell far short of incumbent Republican Alexander Wilson.

He was subsequently elected to four terms as mayor of Mineral Point, in 1879, 1880, 1881, and 1885. He was delegate to the 1880 Democratic National Convention and 1888 Democratic National Convention.  During the first administration of President Grover Cleveland, he negotiated treaties with the Ute Indians and then with the Chippewa Indians.

He was elected to the Wisconsin State Assembly from the Iowa County district in 1892, but did not stand for re-election in 1894.  He ran again in 1896, but lost to Republican incumbent William A. Jones.

He died in Mineral Point, Wisconsin, in 1903.

Electoral history

Wisconsin Attorney General (1879)

| colspan="6" style="text-align:center;background-color: #e9e9e9;"| General Election, November 4, 1879

Wisconsin Assembly (1892)

| colspan="6" style="text-align:center;background-color: #e9e9e9;"| General Election, November 8, 1892

Wisconsin Assembly (1896)

| colspan="6" style="text-align:center;background-color: #e9e9e9;"| General Election, November 3, 1896

References

1834 births
1903 deaths
People from Bedford County, Pennsylvania
People from Mineral Point, Wisconsin
Wisconsin lawyers
County officials in Wisconsin
Mayors of places in Wisconsin
Burials in Wisconsin
19th-century American politicians
Democratic Party members of the Wisconsin State Assembly